Matthew Ebden and Wang Chieh-fu were the Santaizi ATP Challenger defending champions in 2016 but only Wang chose to defend his title, partnering Hung Jui-chen. Wang and Hung lost in the first round to Hsieh Cheng-peng and Yang Tsung-hua.

Hsieh and Yang won the title after defeating Frederik Nielsen and David O'Hare 7–6(8–6), 6–4 in the final.

Seeds

Draw

References

External links
 Main draw

Santaizi ATP Challenger - Doubles
Santaizi ATP Challenger